Alcona County is a county of the U.S. state of Michigan. As of the 2020 Census, the population was 10,167. Its county seat is Harrisville. Alphabetically it is the first county in Michigan; as its flag states, it is the "First of 83".

History

The county was created by the state legislature on April 1, 1840. It was at first named Negwegon County, after the name of a well-known Chippewa chief, also known as "Little Wing". He was honored as having been an American ally against the British in the War of 1812.

It was renamed to Alcona County on March 8, 1843, after a neologism created by Henry Rowe Schoolcraft from parts of words from Native American languages, plus Arabic, Greek and Latin. These were amalgamated to mean "fine or excellent plain". He was an influential US Indian agent and geographer.

Alcona County was initially attached to Mackinac County for purposes of revenue, taxation, and judicial matters. The attachment shifted to Cheboygan County in 1853, to Alpena County in 1857, to Iosco County in 1858, and to Alpena County in 1859.

Harrisville Township, then comprising the entire county, was organized in 1860. County government was organized in 1869, becoming effective on May 8, 1869.
The county's slogan on its seal (a single gold star on a green field in the shape of Alcona County) is "First of 83," which refers to its place alphabetically among Michigan counties.

In 2007, Alcona County was forced to explore options to remedy a major budget shortfall resulting from an official's embezzlement. Former County Treasurer Thomas Katona pleaded guilty in June 2007 to charges that he embezzled more than 1.2 million dollars from county funds to invest them in a Nigerian scam which he fell for.

Katona was sentenced to 9–14 years imprisonment on June 12, 2007, by the 23rd Circuit Court. Judge William Myles said Katona's crimes warranted more severe punishment than called for in state sentencing guidelines, due to the amount of money involved and the number of victims in the case.

Geography

The area is part of the Au Sable State Forest, specifically the Grayling FMU (Alcona, Crawford, Oscoda, and northern Iosco counties). The county is considered to be part of Northern Michigan.

Alcona County has a shoreline on Lake Huron. Through Lake Huron, Alcona County has a water boundary with the Canadian province of Ontario. The Au Sable River flows through the southwest of the county.

Lakes
Lakes in the county include:

 Lake Huron
 Alcona Lake
 Badger Lake
 Bear Lake
 Brownlee Lake
 Byron Lake
 Cedar Lake
 Clear Lake
 Crooked Lake
 Crystal Lake
 Curtis Lake
 Honawan Lake
 Horseshoe Lake
 Hubbard Lake, one of the state's twenty largest inland lakes.
 Hunter Lake
 Indian Lake
 Jenkins lake
 Jewell Lake
 Lost Lake
 North Hoist Lake
 North Lake
 O'Brien Lake
 Poplar Lake
 Reid Lake
 South Hoist Lake
 Tompson Lake

Adjacent counties
 Alpena County - north
 Iosco County - south
 Ogemaw County - southwest
 Oscoda County - west
 Montmorency County - northwest

National protected area
 Huron National Forest (part)

Government
The county government maintains rural roads, operates the local courts, records deeds, mortgages, and vital records, administers public health regulations, and works with state agencies to provide social services. The county
board of commissioners controls the budget and has limited authority to make laws or ordinances. In Michigan, most local government functions — police and fire, building and zoning, tax assessment, street maintenance, etc. — are the responsibility of individual cities and townships.

The Alcona County Circuit Court is part of the 23rd Circuit of Michigan. This multicounty circuit also includes Arenac, Iosco and Oscoda Counties. This court was previously part of the 26th Circuit, which included Alpena and Montmorency Counties.

Elected officials
 Prosecuting Attorney: Thomas Jay Weichel
 Sheriff: Scott A. Stephenson
 County Clerk/Circuit Court Clerk: Stephany Eller
 County Treasurer: Cheryl L. Franks
 Register of Deeds: Melissa A. Cordes
 Road Commissioners: Alfred J. Scully, Harry L. Harvey, Theodore R. Somers
(as of May 2018)

Demographics

As of the 2010 United States Census, there were 10,942 people living in the county. 97.9% were White, 0.6% Native American, 0.2% Asian, 0.1% Black or African American, 0.2% of some other race and 0.9% of two or more races. 1.1% were Hispanic or Latino (of any race).

As of the 2000 United States Census, the county held 11,719 people, 5,132 households, and 3,566 families. The population density was 17 people per square mile (7/km2). There were 10,584 housing units at an average density of 16 per square mile (6/km2). The racial makeup of the county was 98.04% White, 0.16% Black or African American, 0.62% Native American, 0.18% Asian, 0.01% Pacific Islander, 0.06% from other races, and 0.93% from two or more races. 0.69% of the population were Hispanic or Latino of any race. 23.4% were of English, 23.0% German, 9.2% Irish, 7.7% Polish, 7.5% French and 5.0% French-Canadian ancestry according to 2012 American Community Survey. 98.2% spoke English as their first language. Those citing "American" ancestry in Alcona County are of overwhelmingly English extraction, however most English Americans identify simply as having American ancestry because their roots have been in North America for so long, in some cases since the 1600s.

There were 5,132 households; 20.40% had children under the age of 18 living with them, 60.10% were married couples living together, 5.80% had a female householder with no husband present, and 30.50% were non-families. 26.60% of all households were made up of individuals, and 14.20% had someone living alone who was 65 years of age or older. The average household size was 2.24 and the average family size was 2.67.

The county population spread showed 19.00% under the age of 18, 4.60% from 18 to 24, 20.90% from 25 to 44, 31.00% from 45 to 64, and 24.50% who were 65 years of age or older. The median age was 49 years. For every 100 females there were 102.20 males. For every 100 females age 18 and over, there were 99.20 males.

The median income for a household in the county was $31,362, and the median income for a family was $35,669. Males had a median income of $29,712 versus $20,566 for females. The per capita income for the county was $17,653. About 9.10% of families and 12.60% of the population were below the poverty line, including 17.80% of those under age 18 and 9.00% of those age 65 or over.

Religion
Alcona County is considered to be part of the Roman Catholic Diocese of Gaylord. and the Presbytery of Mackinac (http://www.presbymac.org/) and the Presbyterian Church USA (Presbyterian Church/USA- https://www.pcusa.org/).

As of 2012, these church meetinghouses were listed in Alcona County:
 Baptist (general listing) – 7
 Lutheran                  – 7
 Presbyterian (general)    – 3
 Methodist (general)       – 3                  – 
 Episcopal                 – 1
 Seventh-Day Adventist     – 1
Rome Catholic Church - 3

There were no meetinghouses of The Church of Jesus Christ of Latter-day Saints in Alcona in 2018.

Politics
Alcona County has been reliably Republican since the beginning. Since 1884, only five elections did not favor the nominee of the Republican Party.

Transportation

Highways
  — north of Standish, it has been designated the Sunrise Side Coastal Highway. Parallels the Lake Huron shore, connects with M-72 in Harrisville. US 23 is the most proximate connector to Alpena and Mackinaw City.
  — runs along the western side of the county, from US 23 north of Standish to Rogers City.
  — In 1936, downtown Harrisville became the eastern terminus of the 133 mile (214 kilometers) M-72, which runs across the lower peninsula from Empire, Michigan. It is one of three true cross peninsular highways.
  — runs from US 23 at Greenbush through Mikado to M-65 at Glennie.
  —
  — runs north–south from US 23 at Oscoda to US 23 south of Ossineke.

Airport
Alcona County has been a part of developing the Oscoda-Wurtsmith Airport, which became a public airport in 1993. It now occupies a portion of the former Wurtsmith Air Force Base, which is in Oscoda Township, Michigan in neighboring Iosco County, Michigan. It is primarily used for cargo and light general aviation activities. The Airport offers 24-hour near all weather daily access.

Media

Newspapers
 The Alcona County Review located in Harrisville is the county's newspaper of record, and has served the community since 1877.
 The Alpena News serves the northeastern lower peninsula.
 The Oscoda Press is a weekly newspaper serving southern Alcona County and northern Iosco County.
 Daily editions of the Detroit Free Press and The Detroit News are available throughout the area.

Radio
 WXTF-LP

Communities

City
 Harrisville (county seat)

Village
 Lincoln

Civil townships

 Alcona Township
 Caledonia Township
 Curtis Township
 Greenbush Township
 Gustin Township
 Harrisville Township
 Hawes Township
 Haynes Township
 Mikado Township
 Millen Township
 Mitchell Township

Census-designated places
 Hubbard Lake
 Lost Lake Woods

Other unincorporated communities

 Alcona
 Alvin
 Backus Beach
 Barton City
 Black River
 Bryant
 Cheviers
 Curran
 Curtisville
 Glennie
 Greenbush
 Gustin
 Killmaster
 Kurtz 
 Larson Beach
 Mikado
 Springport
 Spruce
 Wallace

Ghost town
 Bamfield

Historical markers
 Greenbush School
 West Harrisville Depot in Lincoln
 Springport Inn, Springport home of Civil War Captain Joseph VanBuskirk.

Parks and recreation
There is a senior citizens center building that opened in the 1940s. In 2023 there was a controversy over how to use a $12,500,000 grant that was to be used to build a replacement building.

See also
 List of counties in Michigan
 List of Michigan State Historic Sites in Alcona County, Michigan
 National Register of Historic Places listings in Alcona County, Michigan

References

Further reading

External links
 Alcona County Government
 Alcona County Review Newspaper
 Alcona County Historical Society
 Alpena News (serving N.E. Michigan)
 Alcona Park
 
 Enchanted forest, Northern Michigan source for information, calendars, etc.
 Harrisville City Airport information and map
 Harrisville Harbor, information, webcam, etc.
 Information and links about Harrisville
 Michigan Department of Natural Resources maps of lakes in Alcona County.
 Sunrise side travel and information

 
Michigan counties
1869 establishments in Michigan